The Discovery Program is a series of Solar System exploration missions funded by the US National Aeronautics and Space Administration (NASA) through its Planetary Missions Program Office. The cost of each mission is capped at a lower level than missions from NASA's New Frontiers or Flagship Programs. As a result, Discovery missions tend to be more focused on a specific scientific goal rather than serving a general purpose.

The Discovery Program was founded in 1990 to implement the policy of the then-NASA administrator Daniel S. Goldin of "faster, better, cheaper" planetary science missions. Existing NASA programs had specified mission targets and objectives in advance, then sought bidders to construct and operate them. In contrast, Discovery missions are solicited through a call for proposals on any science topic and assessed through peer review. Selected missions are led by a scientist called the principal investigator (PI) and may include contributions from industry, universities or government laboratories.

The Discovery Program also includes Missions of Opportunity, which fund US participation in spacecraft operated by other space agencies, for example by contributing a single scientific instrument. It can also be used to re-purpose an existing NASA spacecraft for a new mission.

As of June 2021, the most recently selected Discovery missions were VERITAS and DAVINCI, the fifteenth and sixteenth missions in the program.

History
In 1989, NASA's Solar System Exploration Division began to define a new strategy for Solar System exploration up to the year 2000. This included a Small Mission Program Group that investigated missions that would be low cost and allow focused scientific questions to be addressed in shorter time than existing programs. The result was a request for rapid studies of potential missions and NASA committed funding in 1990. The new program was called "Discovery".

The panel assessed several concepts that could be implemented as low-cost programs, selecting NEAR Shoemaker which became the first launch in the Discovery Program on February 17, 1996. The second mission, Mars Pathfinder, launched on December 4, 1996, carried the Sojourner rover to Mars.

Missions

Standalone missions

Missions of opportunity
These provide opportunities to participate in non-NASA missions by providing funding for a science instrument or hardware components of an instrument, or for an extended mission for a spacecraft that may differ from its original purpose.

 ASPERA-3, an instrument designed to study the interaction between the solar wind and the atmosphere of Mars, is flying on board the European Space Agency's Mars Express orbiter. Launched on 2 June 2003, it has been orbiting Mars since 30 December 2003. The Principal Investigator is David Winningham of Southwest Research Institute.
A NASA contribution to the joint ESA - CNES NetLander Mars meteorological mission was planned, consisting of meteorological, seismic, and geodetic instruments; however, the mission was terminated prior to its 2007 launch.
 Moon Mineralogy Mapper (M3) is a NASA-designed instrument placed on board the ISRO's Chandrayaan orbiter selected in February 2005. Launched in 2008, it was designed to explore the Moon's mineral composition at high resolution. M3's detection of water on the Moon was announced in late September 2009, one month after the mission ended. The Principal Investigator was Carle Pieters of Brown University.
 Extrasolar Planet Observation and Deep Impact Extended Investigation (EPOXI) was selected in July 2007. It was a series of two new missions for the existing Deep Impact probe following its success at Tempel 1:
 The Extrasolar Planet Observations and Characterization (EPOCh) mission used the Deep Impact high-resolution camera in 2008 to better characterize known giant extrasolar planets orbiting other stars and to search for additional planets in the same system, as well as to investigate possible moons and ring systems of said exoplanets. A secondary science goal was to better observe the earth in both infrared and visible light, in order to create better computer models of exoplanets. The Principal Investigator was L. Drake Deming of NASA's Goddard Space Flight Center. 
 The Deep Impact eXtended Investigation of Comets (DIXI) mission used the Deep Impact spacecraft for a flyby mission to a second comet, Hartley 2. The goal was to take pictures of its nucleus to increase our understanding of the diversity of comets. The flyby of Hartley 2 was successful with closest approach occurring on November 4, 2010. Michael A'Hearn of the University of Maryland was the Principal Investigator.
 New Exploration of Tempel 1 (NExT) was selected in July 2007 together with the EPOXI extension. It was a new mission for the Stardust spacecraft to fly by comet Tempel 1 in 2011 and observe changes since the Deep Impact mission visited it in July 2005. Later in 2005, Tempel 1 made its closest approach to the Sun, possibly changing the surface of the comet. The flyby was completed successfully on February 15, 2011. Joseph Veverka of Cornell University is the Principal Investigator.
 Strofio is a mass spectrometer that is a part of the SERENA instrument package on board the Mercury Planetary Orbiter component of the ESA's BepiColombo mission. Strofio will study the atoms and molecules that compose Mercury's atmosphere to reveal the composition of the planet's surface. Stefano Livi of Southwest Research Institute is the Principal Investigator.
 MEGANE (Mars-moon Exploration with GAmma rays and NEutrons) is an instrument planned to fly aboard the Martian Moons Exploration (MMX), a Japanese Aerospace Exploration Agency (JAXA) probe to Phobos and Deimos launching in 2024. MEGANE includes a gamma-ray spectrometer and a neutron spectrometer. David J. Lawrence of Johns Hopkins University is the Principal Investigator.
 In addition, the Lunar Reconnaissance Orbiter was temporarily managed under the Discovery Program from the termination of the Lunar Precursor Robotic Program until the creation of the Lunar Discovery and Exploration Program.

Mission timeline

Proposals and concepts

However often the funding comes in, there is a selection process with perhaps two dozen concepts. These sometimes get further matured and re-proposed in another selection or program. An example of this is Suess-Urey Mission, which was passed over in favor of the successful Stardust mission, but was eventually flown as Genesis, while a more extensive mission similar to INSIDE was flown as Juno in the New Frontiers program. Some of these concepts went on to become actual missions, or similar concepts were eventually realized in another mission class. This list is a mix of previous and current proposals.

Additional examples of Discovery-class mission proposals include:
 Whipple, a space-observatory to detect objects in the Oort cloud by transit method.
 Io Volcano Observer, was proposed for missions 15 or 16, a Jupiter orbiter designed to make 10 flybys of the volcanically active moon Io.
 Comet Hopper (CHopper), a mission to comet 46P/Wirtanen that would've utilised multiple short flights to repeatedly land on the comet's nucleus in order to map various geological processes such as outgassing.
 Titan Mare Explorer (TiME), a lander mission to explore one of the methane lakes found in the north polar region of Titan, a moon of Saturn.
 Suess-Urey, similar to the later Genesis mission.
 Hermes, a Mercury orbiter. (similar to the MESSENGER Mercury orbiter)
 INSIDE Jupiter, an orbiter that would map Jupiter's magnetic and gravity fields in an effort to study the giant planet's interior structure. The concept was further matured and implemented as Juno in the New Frontiers program.
 The Dust Telescope, a space observatory that would measure various properties of incoming cosmic dust. The dust telescope would combine a trajectory sensor and a mass spectrometer, to allow the elemental and even isotopic composition to be analyzed.
 OSIRIS (Origins Spectral Interpretation, Resource Identification and Security), an asteroid observation and sample return mission concept selected in 2006 for further concept studies. It further matured and launched September 8, 2016 as OSIRIS-REx in the New Frontiers Program.
 Small Body Grand Tour, an asteroid rendezvous mission. This 1993 concept reviews possible targets for what became NEAR 4660 Nereus and 2019 Van Albada. Other targets considered for an extended mission included Encke's comet (2P), 433 Eros, 1036 Ganymed, 4 Vesta, and 4015 Wilson–Harrington (1979 VA). (NEAR Shoemaker visited 433 Eros and Dawn visited 4 Vesta)
 Comet Coma Rendezvous Sample Return, a spacecraft designed to rendezvous with a comet, make extended observations within the cometary coma (but not land on the comet), gently collect multiple coma samples, and return them to Earth for study. (Similar to Stardust)
 Micro Exo Explorer, a spacecraft that would've utilised a new form of micro-electric propulsion, called 'Micro Electro-fluidic-spray Propulsion' to travel to a near Earth object and gather important data.

Mars focused

 Pascal, a Mars climate network mission.
 MUADEE (Mars Upper Atmosphere Dynamics, Energetics, and Evolution), an orbiter mission designed to study Mars's upper atmosphere. (similar to MAVEN of the Mars Scout program)
 PCROSS, similar to LCROSS, but directed towards Mars's moon Phobos.
 Merlin, a mission that would place a lander on Mars's moon Deimos.
 Mars Moons Multiple Landings Mission (M4), would conduct multiple landings on Phobos and Deimos.
 Hall, a Phobos and Deimos sample return mission.
 Aladdin, a Phobos and Deimos sample return mission. It was a finalist in the 1999 Discovery selection, with a planned launch in 2001 and return of the samples by 2006. Sample collection was intended to work by sending projectiles into the moons, then collecting the ejecta by means of a collector spacecraft flyby.
 Mars Geyser Hopper, a lander that would investigate the springtime carbon dioxide Martian geysers found in regions around the Martian south pole.
 MAGIC (Mars Geoscience Imaging at Centimeter-scale), an orbiter that would provide images of the Martian surface at 5–10 cm/pixel, permitting resolution of features as small as 20–40 cm.
 Red Dragon, a Mars lander and sample return.

Lunar focused
 Lunar sample return from the South Pole–Aitken basin, current geological models don't adequately describe the area and this mission would have attempted to solve this issue.
 EXOMOON, in situ investigation on Earth's Moon.
 PSOLHO, would use the Moon as an occulter to look for exoplanets.
 Lunette, a lunar lander.
 Twin Lunar Lander, a double lander mission to better understand the Moon's evolution and geology.

Venus focused
 Venus Multiprobe, proposed for a 1999 launch, would have dropped 16 atmospheric probes into Venus, which would fall slowly to the surface, taking pressure and temperature measurements.
 Vesper, a concept for a Venus orbiter focused on studying the planet's atmosphere. It was one of three concepts to receive funds for further study in the 2006 Discovery selection. Osiris and GRAIL were the other two, and eventually GRAIL was chosen and went on to be launched. 
 V-STAR (Venus Sample Targeting, Attainment and Return), a Venus sample return mission with a goal of understanding Venus's evolution. The mission would have consisted of a Venus orbiter with an attached lander. The lander would fall through the Venusian atmosphere, collecting samples along the way, as well as after landing through the use of a "mole". Said lander would launch those samples into a low orbit, where they would rendezvous with the orbiter, returning the samples to Earth.
 VEVA (Venus Exploration of Volcanoes and Atmosphere), an atmospheric probe for Venus. The main component is a 7-day balloon flight through the atmosphere accompanied by various small probes dropped deeper into the planet's thick gases.
 Venus Pathfinder, a long-duration Venus lander. 
 RAVEN, a Venus orbiter radar mapping mission.
 VALOR, a Venus mission to study its atmosphere with a balloon. Twin balloons would circumnavigate the planet over 8 Earth-days. 
 Venus Aircraft, a robotic atmospheric flight on Venus's atmosphere using a long-duration solar-powered aircraft system. It would carry 1.5 kg of scientific payload and would contend with violent wind, heat and a corrosive atmosphere.
 Zephyr, a rover concept that would be propelled by the wind force on its vertical wingsail. Conceived in 2012, the project has since made progress in developing electronic components that would allow the vehicle to operate for 50 days on the surface of Venus without a cooling system.

Selection process

Discovery 1 and 2 

The first two Discovery missions were Near Earth Asteroid Rendezvous (NEAR) (later called Shoemaker NEAR) and Mars Pathfinder. These initial missions did not follow the same selection process that started once the program was under-way. Mars Pathfinder was salvaged from the idea for a technology and EDL demonstrator from the Mars Environmental Survey program. One of the goals of Pathfinder was to support the Mars Surveyor program. Later missions would be selected by a more sequential process involving Announcements of Opportunity.

In the case of NEAR, a working group for the program recommended that the first mission should be to a near-Earth asteroid. A series of proposals limited to missions to a near-Earth asteroid missions were reviewed in 1991. What would be the NEAR spacecraft mission was formally selected in December 1993, after which began a 2-year development period prior to launch. NEAR was launched on February 15, 1996, and arrived to orbit asteroid Eros on February 14, 2000. Mars Pathfinder launched on December 4, 1996, and landed on Mars on July 4, 1997, bringing along with it the first NASA Mars rover, Sojourner.

Discovery 3 and 4 

In August 1994, NASA made an Announcement of Opportunity for the next proposed Discovery missions. There were 28 proposals submitted to NASA in October 1994: 

 ASTER- Asteroid Earth Return
 Comet Nucleus Penetrator
 Comet Nucleus Tour (CONTOUR)
 Cometary Coma Chemical Composition (C4)
 Diana  (Lunar and Cometary Mission)
 FRESIP-A mission to Find the Frequency of Earth-sized Inner Planets
 Hermes Global Orbiter (Mercury Orbiter)
 Icy Moon Mission (Lunar Orbiter)
 Interlune-One (Lunar Rovers)
 Jovian Integrated Synoptic Telescope (IO Torus investigation)
 Lunar Discovery Orbiter
  
 Mainbelt Asteroid Exploration/Rendezvous
 Mars Aerial Platform (Atmospheric)
 Mars Polar Pathfinder (Polar Lander)
 Mars Upper Atmosphere Dynamics, Energetics and Evolution
 Mercury Polar Flyby
 Near Earth Asteroid Returned Sample
 Origin of Asteroids, Comets and Life on Earth
 PELE: A Lunar Mission to Study Planetary Volcanism
 Planetary Research Telescope
 Rendezvous with a Comet Nucleus (RECON)
  
 Small Missions to Asteroids and Comets
  
 Venus Composition Probe (Atmospheric)
 Venus Environmental Satellite (Atmospheric)
  

In February 1995, Lunar Prospector, a lunar orbiter mission, was selected for launch. Three other missions were left to undergo a further selection later in 1995 for the fourth Discovery mission: Stardust, Suess-Urey, and Venus Multiprobe. Stardust, a comet sample-return mission, was selected in November 1995 over the two other finalists.

Discovery 5 and 6 
In October 1997, NASA selected Genesis and CONTOUR as the next Discovery missions, out of 34 proposals that were submitted in December 1996.

The five finalists were:
 Aladdin (Mars moon sample return)
 Comet Nucleus Tour (CONTOUR)
 Genesis (Solar wind sample return)
 Mercury Surface, Space Environment, Geochemistry and Ranging mission (MESSENGER)
 Venus Environmental Satellite (VESAT)

Discovery 7 and 8 

In July 1999, NASA selected MESSENGER and Deep Impact as the next Discovery Program missions. MESSENGER was the first Mercury orbiter and mission to that planet since Mariner 10. Both missions targeted a launch in late 2004 and the cost was constrained at about US$300 million each.

In 1998 five finalists had been selected to receive US$375,000 to further mature their design concept. The five proposals were selected out of about 30 with the goal of achieving the best science. Those missions were:
 Aladdin
 Deep Impact
 MESSENGER
 INSIDE Jupiter
 Vesper

Aladdin and MESSENGER were also finalists in the 1997 selection.

Discovery 9 and 10 

26 proposals were submitted to the 2000 Discovery solicitation, with budget initially targeted at US$300 million. Three candidates were shortlisted in January 2001 for a phase-A design study: Dawn, Kepler space telescope, and INSIDE Jupiter. INSIDE Jupiter was similar to a later New Frontiers mission called Juno; Dawn was a mission to asteroids Vesta and Ceres, and Kepler was a space telescope mission aimed to discover extrasolar planets. The three finalists received US$450,000 to further mature the mission concept.

In December 2001, Kepler and Dawn were selected for flight. At this time, only 80 exoplanets had been detected, and the main mission of Kepler to look for more exoplanets, especially Earth-sized. Both Kepler and Dawn were initially projected for launch in 2006.

Discovery 11 
The original Announcement of Opportunity for a Discovery mission released on April 16, 2004. The only candidate for selection for a concept Phase A study was JASSI, which was a Jupiter flyby mission based on the New Frontiers Mission Juno that was already under consideration for final selection (eventually Juno was selected as the 2nd New Frontiers mission in 2005 and launched in 2011). No other discovery mission proposed in response to the Announcement of Opportunity was considered for concept study and therefore no Discovery mission was selected for this opportunity (although a mission of opportunity was selected (Moon Mineralogy Mapper) as part of the AO in 2004). The next Announcement of Opportunity for a Discovery mission was released on January 3, 2006. There were three finalists for this Discovery selection including GRAIL (the eventual winner), OSIRIS, and VESPER. OSIRIS was very similar to the later OSIRIS-REx mission, an asteroid sample-return mission to 101955 Bennu, and Vesper, a Venus orbiter mission. A previous proposal of Vesper had also been a finalist in the 1998 round of selection. The three finalists were announced in October 2006 and awarded US$1.2 million to further develop their proposals for the final round.

In November 2007 NASA selected the GRAIL mission as the next Discovery mission, with a goal of mapping lunar gravity and a 2011 launch. There were 23 other proposals that were also under consideration. The mission had a budget of US$375 million (then-year dollars) which included construction and launch.

Discovery 12 

The Announcement of Opportunity for a Discovery mission released on June 7, 2010. For this cycle, 28 proposals were received; 3 were for the Moon, 4 for Mars, 7 for Venus, 1 for Jupiter, 1 to a Jupiter Trojan, 2 to Saturn, 7 to asteroids, and 3 to comets. Out of the 28 proposals, three finalists received US$3 million in May 2011 to develop a detailed concept study: 
 InSight, a Mars lander.
 Titan Mare Explorer (TiME), a lake lander for Saturn's moon Titan with methane-ethane lakes.
 Comet Hopper (CHopper) to study cometary evolution by landing on a comet multiple times and observing its changes as it interacts with the Sun.

In August 2012, InSight was selected for development and launch. The mission launched on May 5 2018 and successfully landed on Mars on November 26, 2018.

Discovery 13 and 14 

In February 2014, NASA released a Discovery Program 'Draft Announcement of Opportunity' for launch readiness date of December 31, 2021. The final AO was released on November 5, 2014, and on September 30, 2015, NASA selected five mission concepts as finalists, each received $3 million for one-year of further study and concept refinement.

Deep Atmosphere Venus Investigation of Noble gases, Chemistry, and Imaging (DAVINCI)
Venus Emissivity, Radio Science, InSAR Topography and Spectroscopy (VERITAS)
Near-Earth Object Camera (NEOCam)
Lucy
Psyche

On January 4, 2017, Lucy and Psyche were selected for the 13th and 14th Discovery missions, respectively. Lucy will fly by five Jupiter trojans, asteroids which share Jupiter's orbit around the Sun, orbiting either ahead of or behind the planet. Psyche will explore the origin of planetary cores by orbiting and studying the metallic asteroid 16 Psyche.

Discovery 15 and 16
On December 22, 2018, NASA released a draft of its Discovery 2019 Announcement of Opportunity, which outlined its intent to select up to two missions with launch readiness dates of July 1, 2025 – December 31, 2026 and/or July 1, 2028 – Dec. 31, 2029 as Discovery 15 and 16, respectively. The final Announcement of Opportunity was released on April 1, 2019, and proposal submissions were accepted between then and July 1, 2019. 

Finalists, announced on February 13, 2020, were:

DAVINCI (Deep Atmosphere Venus Investigation of Noble gases, Chemistry, and Imaging), a Venus atmospheric probe.
Io Volcano Observer, an orbiter to Jupiter to perform at least nine flybys of Jupiter's volcanically active moon Io.
Trident, a probe that would conduct a flyby of Neptune and its moon Triton.
VERITAS (Venus Emissivity, Radio Science, InSAR, Topography, and Spectroscopy), a Venus orbiter to map the surface of Venus in high resolution.
On June 2, 2021, NASA administrator Bill Nelson announced in his "State of NASA" address that the two Venus missions, VERITAS and DAVINCI, had been selected for development. The two missions will launch between 2029 and 2031.

Other proposal submissions for Discovery 15 and 16 missions included:

Asteroids, comets, Centaurs, interplanetary dust
Centaurus, a reconnaissance mission to explore multiple Centaurs via flybys as a way to learn about Solar System and planet formation.
Chimera, a mission concept to orbit the highly active Centaur 29P/Schwasmann-Wachmann 1, to study the evolutionary middle ground between the Trans Neptunian Objects (TNOs) and Jupiter Family Comets.
FOSSIL (Fragments from the Origins of the Solar System and our Interstellar Locale), a spacecraft to be placed in an Earth-trailing orbit to determine the composition of the local and interplanetary dust cloud.
MANTIS (Main-belt Asteroid and NEO Tour with Imaging and Spectroscopy), a mission that would flyby 14 asteroids covering a wide range of types and masses.

Venus
HOVER (Hyperspectral Observer for Venus Reconnaissance), a Venus orbiter that would perform spectral studies from the top of the atmosphere to the surface. Its main goal is understanding the mechanics of the Venus climate and atmospheric super-rotation.

Lunar
Moon Diver, a lunar lander which would deploy a rover to rappel down a deep pit, analyzing the exposed geological layers and investigate if the pit connects to a lava tube.
Lunar Compass Rover, a rover designed to explore a nearside magnetic region and swirl, and would answer some questions in planetary science, including planetary magnetism, space plasma physics, space weathering, planetary geology, and the lunar water cycle. A proposal for Lunar Compass was not submitted to this Discovery round.
ISOCHRON (Inner SOlar system CHRONology), a mission that would perform a robotic lunar sample-return of the youngest mare basalts.
NanoSWARM, a lunar orbiter to investigate lunar swirls, space weathering, lunar water, lunar magnetism, and small-scale magnetospheres.

Mars
COMPASS (Climate Orbiter for Mars Polar Atmospheric and Subsurface Science) is a mission concept for a Mars orbiter to research the Martian climate record through the study of its ice deposits and their interaction with current climate. This mission is led by the Lunar and Planetary Laboratory at the University of Arizona and the Laboratory for Atmospheric and Space Physics at the University of Colorado, Boulder.
Icebreaker Life, a mission concept led by the Ames Research Center for a lander to search for direct signs of life on Mars via biomarker detection, with a focus on sampling ice-cemented ground for its potential to preserve and protect biomolecules or biosignatures.

Jupiter

MAGIC (Magnetics, Altimetry, Gravity and Imaging of Callisto) is an orbiter reconnaissance concept to Jupiter's moon Callisto.

Gallery

Artists' impressions

Mission insignias
This section includes an image of the Discovery missions' patches or logos, as well as the launch year.

Launches
This section includes an image of the Discovery missions' rockets, as well as the launch year.

References

External links

 Official NASA website for Discovery Program

 
NASA programs